Kay Smith (born 1923) is a historical artist, who specializes in using watercolors and depicting landscapes.

Early life
Smith grew up in Vandalia, Illinois and was the fourth of six children.

Career

During World War II, she moved to Chicago and attended classes at the School of the Art Institute of Chicago.  She worked as a commercial illustrator until the 1970s, when she turned to historical subjects. She visited historical sites to depict them accurately and raise awareness about these sites importance to the national heritage.

For 21 years, Smith taught a watercolor class at the Old Town Triangle Art Center in Old Town, Chicago.

She has produced four books on her artwork and more than 250 paintings. She illustrated over 30 books for Thomas Jones, an editor at J.G. Ferguson Publishing Co.

Later life
At the age of 73, she was struck by Guillain–Barré syndrome which left her almost paralyzed. After rehabilitation, her daughter encouraged her to keep painting.  She is still taking commissions after turning 90 years of age.

Awards and recognition

In 1994, she was named the Artist Laureate of Illinois by The Lincoln Academy of Illinois.

Major works

Her major works include a series of Abraham Lincoln-related sites, Red Tails escorting the B17s on display at the Pritzker Military Museum & Library, and paintings depicting famous Illinois sites on display at the Illinois Governors' Mansion.

She was commissioned by The Ernest Hemingway Foundation of Oak Park to do paintings depicting the Ernest Hemingway books The Snows of Kilimanjaro and The Old Man and the Sea.  Some of her Hemingway paintings were exhibited as part of the Hemingway Centennial Celebration in Oak Park in 1999.

References

Bibliography
 
 
 Monroe, Dan, Lura Lynn Ryan, and Kay Lovelace Smith. At Home with Illinois Governors: A Social History of the Illinois Executive Mansion, 1855–2003. [Springfield, IL]: Illinois Executive Mansion Association, 2002.  
 Whitney, David C., Kay Lovelace Smith, and Thomas C. Jones. The American Legacy: A Pageant of Great Deeds and Famous Words. Chicago: J.G. Ferguson, 1975. 
 Whitney, David C. and Kay Lovelace Smith. The Colonial Spirit of '76: The People of the Revolution: The Lives of Members of the Continental Congresses and Other Prominent Men and Women of the Period. Chicago: J.G. Ferguson Pub. Co., 1974.

External links
 Official website 
  Kay Smith Paints the Red Tails
 

Living people
1923 births
20th-century American painters
21st-century American painters
Military art
Artists from Chicago
School of the Art Institute of Chicago alumni
American women painters
20th-century American women artists
21st-century American women artists
People from Vandalia, Illinois
People with Guillain–Barré syndrome